The Coastal Batholith of central Chile is a group of plutons in the Chilean Coast Range of Central Chile appearing contiguously from 33° S to 38° S. At a latitude of 40° S an outlying group of plutons of the batholith appear in a more eastward position in the Andes.

Together with the Elqui-Limarí Batholith and the Colangüil Batholith, the Coastal Batholith of central Chile is a remnant of the volcanic arcs that erupted the volcanic material of the Choiyoi Group. During the Permian the zone of arc magmatism moved from the Coastal Batholith 350 km inland reaching San Rafael about 280 million years ago. The batholith is emplaced amidst metamorphic rocks belonging to a Paleozoic accretionary complex. The northern parts are of the batholith are themselves intruded by Jurassic gabbros.

Rocks of the batholith belong to the calc-alkaline magma series.

References 

Batholiths of South America
Lithodemic units of Chile
Carboniferous South America
Carboniferous Chile
Carboniferous magmatism
Geology of the Chilean Coast Range
Geology of Araucanía Region
Geology of Biobío Region
Geology of Los Ríos Region
Geology of Maule Region
Geology of O'Higgins Region
Geology of Santiago Metropolitan Region
Geology of Valparaíso Region
Coasts of Valparaíso Region
Coasts of O'Higgins Region